Ahmad Qanbar (1900–1971) was a Syrian politician and journalist served as interior minister for five times.

Career 
He started his career by establishing a newspaper in Aleppo named Al Nazir in 1937. In 1947, he became a founding member of the People's Party, one year after Syria's independence from the French Mandate. The party's platform revolved around strengthening Syrian democracy, distributing political power—which was largely concentrated in the hands of Damascus-based politicians—throughout the country, and uniting with neighboring Iraq. It was allied and financed by the Hashemites, who were in power in both Iraq and Jordan.  

He was elected in the parliament from 1947 to 1961, and served as interior minister for five terms between in 1950s and 1960s. 

In 1963, Qanbar's civil rights were terminated after coup of al Baath party.

References 

1900 births
1971 deaths
20th-century Syrian politicians
Syrian Muslims
Syrian ministers of interior
Members of the People's Assembly of Syria
People from Aleppo